Robert Farren (24 April 1909 – 29 December 1984) was an Irish poet.

Farren was a native of County Dublin, where he worked as a school teacher and was a director of broadcasting at Raidió Teilifís Éireann. He was the author of a much-acclaimed critical work, The Course of Irish Verse in English (1948). Five of his own poems were included in The Oxford Book of Irish Verse, 17th century-20th century (ed. by Donagh MacDonagh and Lennox Robinson, Clarendon Press) in 1958.

References
 http://www.ricorso.net/rx/az-data/index.htm

1909 births
1984 deaths
Artists from Dublin (city)
20th-century Irish poets
20th-century male writers
Irish poets